The Time of Their Lives is a 1946 American fantasy-comedy film starring the comedic duo Abbott and Costello and directed by Charles Barton.

Plot
In 1780, master tinker Horatio Prim arrives at the Kings Point estate of Tom Danbury. Although Horatio has failed to raise enough money to buy Danbury's housemaid, Nora O'Leary out of indentured servitude, he carries a letter of commendation from Gen. George Washington that he hopes will persuade Danbury to let them marry. Unfortunately, Horatio has a romantic rival in Danbury's devious butler, Cuthbert Greenway, who tries to prevent Horatio from presenting his letter. Nora, however, rushes off to show the letter to Danbury, but she inadvertently overhears Danbury discussing his part in Benedict Arnold's plot. Danbury seizes Nora and hides the letter in a secret compartment in the mantel clock. Danbury's fiancée, Melody Allen, standing outside the window, witnesses this betrayal and enlists Horatio's help to ride off and warn Washington's army. But American troops on their way to arrest Tom overrun the estate, loot it and set it ablaze. Melody and Horatio are mistakenly shot as traitors, and their bodies are cast into a well. Their souls are condemned to remain bound to the estate until their innocence can be proved.

For the next 166 years the ghosts of Horatio and Melody roam the grounds of the estate. In 1946, after the estate has been rebuilt and restored with much of its original furnishings, playwright Sheldon Gage invites his fiancée, June Prescott, her Aunt Millie, and his psychiatrist, Dr. Ralph Greenway, a descendant of Cuthbert, to spend the weekend.

They are greeted by the clairvoyant maid, Emily, who senses that the grounds are haunted. Ghosts Horatio and Melody have some fun with this idea and scare the guests in various ways — especially Greenway, whom Horatio at first mistakes for Cuthbert. Horatio and Melody also find themselves frightened by modern inventions like the electric light and the radio. These supernatural events prompt the newcomers to hold a séance led by Emily. From clues offered by Horatio, Melody and Tom's repentant spirit, they discern the identities of the ghosts and the existence of the letter which can free them.

The group searches for Horatio's letter, but the original mantel clock containing the letter is in a New York museum. Greenway, to atone for the misdeeds of his ancestor, goes to the museum to retrieve the letter. But when museum officials refuse to let him examine the clock, Greenway steals it. He arrives back at the estate where the state police are waiting for him. They arrest Greenway, but are prevented from taking him off the estate by the curse that binds Horatio and Melody to it. When the clock is finally opened and the letter is revealed, Melody and Horatio's innocence is proven and they are freed. Each is called to heaven by a loved one; Melody by Tom, and Horatio by Nora, who meets him at heaven's gate but points to a sign that reads, "Closed for Washington's Birthday". Horatio must wait one more day to get into heaven.

Cast

 Bud Abbott as Cuthbert Greenway / Dr. Ralph Greenway
 Lou Costello as Horatio Prim
 Marjorie Reynolds as Melody Allen
 Binnie Barnes as Mildred Dean
 John Shelton as Sheldon Gage
 Gale Sondergaard as Emily
 Lynn Baggett as June Prescott
 Jess Barker as Thomas Danbury
 Ann Gillis as Nora O'Leary
 Donald MacBride as Lt. Mason
 William Hall as Sgt. Conners
 Robert Barrat as Maj. Putnam
 Rex Lease as Sgt. Makepeace
 Kirk Alyn as Dandy at Party
 Harry Brown as Second Sergeant
 George M. Carleton as Museum Guard
 Wheaton Chambers as Bill, Museum Guard
 James Conaty as Party Guest
 John Crawford as Dandy at Party
 Vernon Downing as Leigh, Traitor
 Marjorie Eaton as Bessie, Danbury's Maid
 Myron Healey as Dandy at Party
 Boyd Irwin as Cranwell, Traitor
 Selmer Jackson as Mr. Dibbs, Museum Curator
 William H. O'Brien as Danbury Servant
 Scott Thomson as Dandy at Party
 Harry Woolman as Motorcycle Rider

Production
The Time of Their Lives was filmed at Universal Studios from March 6 through May 15, 1946. The working title was The Ghost Steps Out. It was the first Abbott and Costello film to be directed by Charles Barton, who would go on to helm eight of their movies, including Abbott and Costello Meet Frankenstein (1948).

As in the duo's preceding film, Little Giant, Abbott and Costello do not play friends or partners, but are individual characters. Also as in the previous movie, Costello's character is largely the hero, while Abbott plays a somewhat unsympathetic dual role. The team's trademark burlesque routines are absent, and they speak directly to each other only in one scene at the beginning of the film. This change in the comics' onscreen formula was reportedly due to both disappointing box office receipts for their 1945 films The Naughty Nineties, Here Come the Co-Eds, and Abbott and Costello in Hollywood, and personal tensions that led to a brief break up that year.

Advertising materials for the film depicted both Abbott and Costello in modern clothes, and gave no indication that the film was part period piece or fantasy.

Bud Abbott, who had epilepsy and never learned to drive, learned to drive for one scene in this film. According to his son, Bud Abbott Jr., this was the only time in his life he ever drove an automobile.

A few weeks into filming, Costello wanted to switch roles with Abbott. He refused to report to work, but director Charles Barton waited him out. Costello eventually returned, said nothing more about it, and continued in the same role.

Reception
Although the film was a departure from the usual Abbott and Costello formula, Variety magazine called it "a picnic for Abbott and Costello fans" that "won't shock the patrons with any unfamiliar novelties ... Direction is well-aimed at the belly-laugh level, and the trick photography is handled with flawless technique." Motion Picture Daily wrote, "Any resemblance between this and the last half dozen Abbott and Costello pictures is so slight and incidental as to be written off completely by the showmen whose customers used to raise the rafters with shouts and screams of laughter in the dawn of the A. and C. era. The audience present at the previewing of The Time of Their Lives at the Forum Theater in Los Angeles all but rolled in the aisles with merriment, exactly as in the good old days." The Hollywood Reporter wrote, "By long odds, it is the best A&C show to date."

Trade critic sentiment did not translate into box-office, however. Abbott and Costello slipped to 20th place overall (but 12th among independent theater owners) in the 1946 Motion Picture Herald poll of top money making stars after placing 11th overall (and 12th among independent theater owners) in 1945.

Re-release
The film was re-released in 1951, along with Little Giant.

Home media
The film has been released three times on VHS: 1989, 1991, and 2000. It has also been released twice on DVD: The Best of Abbott and Costello Volume Two on May 4, 2004; and on October 28, 2008 as part of Abbott and Costello: The Complete Universal Pictures Collection.

See also
 List of ghost films
 List of Abbott and Costello Films
 List of films about the American Revolution

References

External links

 
 
 
 

1946 films
1940s fantasy comedy films
Abbott and Costello films
American black-and-white films
American fantasy comedy films
American ghost films
American Revolutionary War films
1940s English-language films
Films directed by Charles Barton
Films set in 1780
Films set in 1946
Films set in the United States
Universal Pictures films
1946 comedy films
1940s American films